Peters's sheath-tailed bat (Paremballonura atrata) is a species of sac-winged bat in the family Emballonuridae.  It is found only in Madagascar.

References

Emballonuridae
Mammals described in 1874
Taxa named by Wilhelm Peters
Mammals of Madagascar
Endemic fauna of Madagascar
Taxonomy articles created by Polbot